Sixty fellowships were awarded in 1936, bringing the total number of recipients to 525. The Guggenheim family donated an additional $1,000,000 to the Foundation, increasing the scholarship pool to $6,000,000.

1936 U.S. and Canadian Fellows

1936 Latin American and Caribbean Fellows

See also
 Guggenheim Fellowship
 List of Guggenheim Fellowships awarded in 1935
 List of Guggenheim Fellowships awarded in 1937

References

1936
1936 awards